Arthur MacDonald "Art" Pearson (February 20, 1938 - December 8, 2020) is a former political figure in the Yukon, Canada. He served as the commissioner of Yukon from 1976 to 1978.

He was born in Brandon, Manitoba and was educated there, at the University of British Columbia and the University of Helsinki. In 1959, Pearson married Sandra Mooney. He was a biologist with the Canadian Wildlife Service from 1962 to 1975, during that time he researched the activities of grizzly bears. Pearson lived in Whitehorse.

He resigned as commissioner in 1978 after pleading guilty to charges related to improper mining claim transfers. Pearson died peacefully after a long battle with chronic lymphocytic leukemia on December 8, 2020.

References 
 

1936 births
Commissioners of Yukon
Living people
People from Brandon, Manitoba